James Langdon may refer to:

 James C. Langdon Jr. (born 1945), American attorney and former government official
 James Langdon Jr. (born 1938), member of the North Carolina General Assembly